KKCQ (1480 AM) is a full service formatted broadcast radio station featuring a mix of talk and oldies music.  KKCQ is licensed to Fosston, Minnesota, serving Eastern Polk County, Minnesota and Clearwater County, Minnesota.  It's owned by Jimmy Birkemeyer, through licensee R&J Broadcasting, Inc.

Programming
News comes from ABC radio and the Minnesota News Network.

Location
It sits east of downtown Fosston at 30056 U.S. Highway 2, along with sister station KKCQ-FM.  The transmitter site and towers are the studios.

Call sign history
The station was assigned the KKCQ call letters by the Federal Communications Commission on November 16, 1984. It was originally KEHG, then owned by De La Hunt Broadcasting.

References

External links
RJ Broadcasting official website

Radio stations in Minnesota
Talk radio stations in the United States
Oldies radio stations in the United States
Radio stations established in 1966
Polk County, Minnesota